Taxus is a genus of coniferous trees or shrubs known as yews in the family Taxaceae. The oldest known fossil species are from the Early Cretaceous.

Morphology

The arils are mature 6–9 months after pollination, and with the seed contained are eaten by thrushes, waxwings and other birds, which disperse the hard seeds undamaged in their droppings; maturation of the arils is spread over 2–3 months, increasing the chances of successful seed dispersal. Yews are mostly dioecious, but occasional individuals can be variably monoecious, or change sex with time.

Taxonomy and systematics

All of the yews are very closely related to each other, and some botanists treat them all as subspecies or varieties of just one widespread species; under this treatment, the species name used is Taxus baccata, the first yew described scientifically. Other sources, however, recognize 9 species, for example the Plant List.

Taxus species appear similar. Attempts at taxonomy vary from describing all yews as subspecies of T. baccata, as did RKF Pilger in 1903, to splitting species by even very small morphological differences, as did R. W. Spjut in 2007 with 25 species and over 50 varieties. Some species have traditionally been recognized by geographic distribution, but Asian species have been more difficult to classify. T. contorta in the Western Himalaya and T. sumatrana in Malesia are now generally agreed upon, but overlapping ranges in the Eastern Himalaya, China, and subtropical southeast Asia have led to greater confusion, with the species T. chinensis, T. mairei, and T. wallichiana being elucidated only in the 21st century with the aid of molecular phylogenetics.

The most distinct is the Sumatran yew (T. sumatrana, native to Sumatra and Celebes north to southernmost China), distinguished by its sparse, sickle-shaped yellow-green leaves. The Mexican yew (T. globosa, native to eastern Mexico south to Honduras) is also relatively distinct with foliage intermediate between Sumatran yew and the other species. The Florida yew, Mexican yew and Pacific yew are all rare species listed as threatened or endangered.

Distribution
Yews occur around the globe in temperate zones of the northern hemisphere, northernmost in Norway and southernmost in the South Celebes. Some populations exist in tropical highlands. Yews typically occur in the understory or canopy of moist temperate or tropical mountain forests.
Yews are common in landscape architecture, giving rise to widespread naturalized populations in the United States. There, both T. baccata and T. cuspidata are common ornamental shrubs.

T. baccata appears throughout Europe and into western Asia. T. cuspidata occurs over much of East Asia, in China, Japan, Korea, and Sakhalin. T. brevifolia ranges in the United States from California to Montana and Alaska, while T. canadensis appears in the northeastern United States and southeast Canada.

Species and hybrids

Taxus baccata , European yew
Taxus brevifolia , Pacific yew, western yew
Taxus calcicola , Asian limestone yew
Taxus canadensis , Canada yew
Taxus chinensis , China yew
Taxus contorta , West Himalayan yew
Taxus cuspidata , Rigid branch yew, Japanese yew
Taxus floridana , Florida yew
Taxus florinii , Florin yew
Taxus globosa , Mesoamerican yew
Taxus mairei , Maire yew
Taxus wallichiana , Wallich yew, East Himalayan yew

Fossil (extinct) species
Taxus engelhardtii – Oligocene, Bohemia, twig-leaves, similar to T. mairei
Taxus inopinata – Upper Miocene, leaf, similar to T. baccata
Taxus masonii – Eocene Clarno Formation; Oregon, USA
Taxus schornii – Miocene, northern Idaho

Commonly reported hybrids

Taxus × media = Taxus baccata × Taxus cuspidata
Taxus × hunnewelliana = Taxus cuspidata × Taxus canadensis

Phylogeny
Below is a cladogram showing the evolutionary relationships between yew species and their global distribution.

Toxicity

All species of yew contain highly poisonous taxine alkaloids, with some variation in the exact formula of the alkaloid between the species. All parts of the tree except the arils contain the alkaloid. The arils are edible and sweet, but the seed is dangerously poisonous; unlike birds, the human stomach can break down the seed coat and release the toxins into the body. This can have fatal results if yew 'berries' are eaten without removing the seeds first. Grazing animals, particularly cattle and horses, are also sometimes found dead near yew trees after eating the leaves, though deer are able to break down the poisons and will eat yew foliage freely. In the wild, deer browsing of yews is often so extensive that wild yew trees are commonly restricted to cliffs and other steep slopes inaccessible to deer. The foliage is also eaten by the larvae of some Lepidopteran insects including the moth willow beauty.

Allergenic potential

All parts of a yew plant are toxic to humans with the exception of the yew berries (which however contain a toxic seed); additionally, male and dioecious yews in this genus release cytotoxic pollen, which can cause headaches, lethargy, aching joints, itching, and skin rashes; it is also a trigger for asthma. These pollen granules are extremely small, and can easily pass through window screens. Male yews bloom and release abundant amounts of pollen in the spring; completely female yews only trap pollen while producing none.

Yews in this genus are primarily separate-sexed, and males are extremely allergenic, with an OPALS allergy scale rating of 10 out of 10. Completely female yews have an OPALS rating of 1, and are considered "allergy-fighting".

Uses and traditions

Bows
Yew wood is reddish brown (with whiter sapwood), and is very springy. It was traditionally used to make bows, especially the longbow.

Latin taxus, "yew tree," is probably borrowed, via Greek, from Taxša, the Scythian word for yew (and bow) (cognate of Persian تخش Taxš, meaning bow).

Ötzi, the Chalcolithic mummy found in 1991 in the Italian Alps, carried an unfinished bow made of yew wood. Consequently, it is not surprising that in Norse mythology, the abode of the god of the bow, Ullr, had the name Ydalir (Yew Dales). Most longbow wood used in northern Europe was imported from Iberia, where climatic conditions are better for growing the knot-free yew wood required. The yew longbow was the critical weapon used by the English in the defeat of the French cavalry at the Battle of Agincourt, 1415. British yews tend to be too gnarly, and thus the wood for English longbows used at the Battle of Agincourt was imported from Spain or northern Italy.

Cultivation
It is suggested that English parishes were required to grow yews and, because of the trees' toxic properties, they were grown in the only commonly enclosed area of a village – the churchyard. The yew tree can often be found in church graveyards and is symbolic of sadness. Such a representation appears in Lord Alfred Tennyson's poem "In Memoriam A.H.H." (2.61–64).

The yew can be very long-lived. The Fortingall Yew has been considered to be the oldest tree in Europe, at something over 2,000 years old. Tradition has it that Pontius Pilate slept under it while on duty before 30 AD. This has been topped by a tree in the churchyard of a small Welsh village called St Cynog. It has been dated to 5,000 years old by dendrologist Janis Fry. Such old trees usually consist of a circular ring of growths of yew, since their heart has long since rotted away.

The Eihwaz rune is named after the yew, and sometimes also associated with the "evergreen" world tree, Yggdrasil.

Horticulture

Yews are widely used in landscaping and ornamental horticulture. Over 400 cultivars of yews have been named, the vast majority of these being derived from European yew (Taxus baccata) or Japanese yew (Taxus cuspidata). The hybrid between these two species is Taxus × media. A popular fastigiate selection of the European yew (Taxus baccata 'Fastigiata') is often called the Irish yew, illustrating the difficulties with common names. A few cultivars with yellow leaves are collectively known as golden yews.

Chemistry
The Pacific yew (Taxus brevifolia), native to the Pacific Northwest of North America, and the Canada yew (Taxus canadensis) of Eastern and Central North America were the initial sources of paclitaxel or Taxol, a chemotherapeutic drug used in breast and lung cancer treatment and, more recently, in the production of the Taxus drug eluting stent by Boston Scientific. Over-harvesting of the Pacific yew for paclitaxel led to fears that it would become an endangered species, since the drug was initially extracted from the bark of the yew, the harvesting of which kills the tree. On January 18, 2008, the Botanic Gardens Conservation International (representing botanic gardens in 120 countries) stated that "400 medicinal plants are at risk of extinction, from over-collection and deforestation, threatening the discovery of future cures for disease." These included yew trees, whose bark is used for the cancer drug paclitaxel.

However, methods were developed to produce the drug semi-synthetically from the leaves of cultivated European yews. Those can be sustainably harvested without the need to further endanger wild populations, and the Pacific yew is no longer at risk. The more common Canada yew is also being successfully harvested in northern Ontario, Quebec and New Brunswick, and has become another major source of paclitaxel. Other yew species contain similar compounds with similar biochemical activity. Docetaxel, an analogue of paclitaxel, is derived from the European yew (Taxus baccata).

In culture
The yew tree is a frequent symbol in the Christian poetry of T. S. Eliot, especially his Four Quartets.

References

External links

 
Conifer genera
Dioecious plants